Hockey is a family of team games.

Hockey may also refer to:

Horkey, a harvest custom in England and Ireland also known as 'Hock(e)y'
Hockey (album), 1980 John Zorn album
Hockey (band), American indie rock band
Hockey (1981 video game), published by Gamma Software for the Atari 8-bit family
Hockey (1992 video game), published by Atari Corporation for the Atari Lynx
An alternative spelling of oche
People
Joe Hockey (born 1965), Australian politician
Lisbeth Hockey (1918-2004), British nurse and researcher
Susan Hockey (born 1946), British professor of information studies

See also